Mehrinabad (also Romanized as Mehrīnābād; also known as Mehrānābād) is a village in Aq Bolagh Rural District, Sojas Rud District, Khodabandeh County, Zanjan Province, Iran. At the 2006 census, its population was 160, in 36 families.

References 

Populated places in Khodabandeh County